Mansehra is a city in the Khyber Pakhtunkhwa province of Pakistan and the headquarters of Mansehra District. It is the 71st largest city of Pakistan and 7th largest city in the province.

The city hosts the Mansehra Shiva Temple, which is famous for its annual Shivarathri festival.

History

Maurya rule

The region came under the influence of the Nanda Empire of ancient India from 300 BCE, and with the rise of Chandragupta Maurya, the region came under the complete control of the Mauryan Empire. Ashoka governed this area as a prince, imperial throne  272 BCE. he made it one of the major seats of his government. The Edicts of Ashoka inscribed on three large boulders near Mansehra record fourteen of Ashoka's edicts, presenting aspects of the emperor's dharma or righteous law. These represent some of the earliest evidence of deciphered writing in South Asia, dating to middle of the third century BCE, and are written from right to left in the Kharosthi script.

Shungas, Kushans, and Guptas
The region was briefly and nominally controlled by the Shunga Empire. However, with the decline of the Shungas, the region passed to local Hindu and Buddhist rulers, and interrupted by foreign rulers. Many of these foreign rulers, like the Indo-Parthians, Sakas, and Kushans converted to Buddhism, and promoted these Indian religions throughout Central and South Asia. The region reached its height under the Buddhist ruler Kanishka the Great. After the fall of the Kushans, the region came under the control of the Gupta Empire of ancient India. During the period, Hindu and Buddhist art and architecture flourished in the area.

Hindu Shahi rule
With the decline of the imperial Guptas, the Hindu Shahis came to rule the area. The Hindu Shahis built two massive forts in the northern edges of the region. The forts were later renamed as "Kafirkots" (forts of the infidel). These Hindu Shahi forts were known for high towers and steep defensive walls. The Hindus also built many Hindu temples around the area, however, much of them are now in rubble. The Hindu Shahis remained in control of the area until their defeat by the Turkic Muslim army of Ghaznavids in the year 1001.

Ghaznavids, Ghurids, Delhi Sultanate & Mughals
For the next seven centuries the area was under the control of various Islamic empires and sultanates such as the Ghaznavids, Ghurids, Delhi Sultanate and eventually the imperial Mughal Empire.

Durranis and Marathas
Ahmad Shah Durrani, the founder of the Afghan Durrani Empire, captured the region around the mid-1700s from the Mughal Empire, however, Durrani quickly retreated from the region. Ahmad Shah Durrani again invaded the region with Timur Shah Durrani having nominal rule. Durrani rule was interrupted by the Maratha Empire's under Raghunathrao, who drove out the Afghans, Following the Third Battle of Panipat, Ahmad Shah Durrani defeated the Marathas and recaptured Lahore, Sikh forces occupied the region after the Durranis withdrew. The Durranis invaded two more times, while the Sikhs would re-occupy the region after both invasions.

Sikh rule
The fall of the Afghan Durrani Empire made way for the Sikhs to rise to power under Ranjit Singh. The Sikhs gained control of the area in 1818. The town of Mansehra was founded by Mahan Singh Mirpuri, a Sikh governor. There were popular uprisings against Sikh rule, but these uprisings failed and the Sikhs remained in power until 1849 when the area came under British rule.  The town is named in Mahan Singh Mirpuri's honor.

British period
By 1849, the British had gained control of all of Mansehra. To maintain peace in the area, the British took preventive measures by co-opting the local chiefs.

The British divided Hazara region into three tehsils (administrative subdivisions): Mansehra, Abbottabad, and Haripur.  In 1901, when the British formed the buffer province of North West Frontier Province (NWFP), Hazara was annexed into it.

During British rule, Mansehra was a small town. Its population according to the 1901 census was 5,087. During the British period, Mansehra was the headquarters of Mansehra Tehsil.

In 1976 Mansehra Tehsil was made district and Mansehra became the centre of it.

Organisation
Mansehra City is the administrative capital of District and Tehsil Mansehra. The City of Mansehra is administratively divided into four Union Councils: Mansehra City Wards  1–4 and Mansehra (Rural)/suburban. Each union council is divided into Mohallas.

Cultural festival

During the festival of Durgashtami, held in the first month of the Hindu calendar and the seventh month of the Nanakshahi calendar, about 400 local Hindus assemble on Bareri Hill to worship Devi (as Durga). Offerings are taken by a Brahmin of Mansehra. The assembly on each occasion lasts only one day. The site is ancient, as at the base of Bareri Hill are the boulders inscribed with the Edicts of Ashoka.

See also
Balakot
Battangi
Kaghan Valley

References

External links
Mansehra Valley
Hazara University
Tourism Corporation of KPK
Rural Community Council (RCC), Pakistan

Populated places in Mansehra District
Mansehra District
Cities in Khyber Pakhtunkhwa